Jju (Tyap: Jhyuo; Hausa: Kaje, Kache) is the native language of the Bajju people of Kaduna State in central Nigeria. As of 1988, there were approximately 300,000 speakers. According to Blench (2008), Jju—with more speakers—appears to be a form of Tyap (although its speakers are ethnically distinct).

Bajju is one of the Southern Kaduna languages.

Distribution
Jju is spoken as a first language by the Bajju people in Zangon Kataf, Jema'a, Kachia, Kaura and Kaduna South Local Government Areas of Kaduna state. It is also spoken in neighbouring Atyap, Fantswam, Agworok, Ham, Adara, and other kin communities as a second or third language.

Numerals
A̠yring
A̠hwa
A̠tat
A̠naai
A̠pfwon
A̠kitat
A̠tiyring
A̠ninai
A̠kumbvuyring
Swak
Swak bu a̠yring
Swak bu a̠hwa
Swak bu a̠tat
Swak bu a̠naai
Swak bu a̠pfwon
Swak bu a̠kitat
Swak bu a̠tiyring
Swak bu a̠ninai
Swak bu a̠kumbvuyring)P″
Nswak nh|c

30. Nswak ntat
40. Nswak nnaai
50. Nswak npfwon
60. Nswak a̠kitat
70. Nswak a̠tiyring
80. Nswak a̠ninai
90. Nswak a̠kumbvuyring
100. Cyi
1000. Cyikwop

References

External links

Central Plateau languages
Languages of Nigeria